The Honey Baked Ham Company is a food retailer which sells hams, turkey breasts and other pre-cooked entrées, side dishes, and desserts. It was founded in 1957 in Detroit and is currently headquartered in Alpharetta, Georgia. As of June 5, 2020 it has 492 outlets across the United States.

History

In 1924, Harry Hoenselaar created a bone-in spiral-slicer that smoked and cooked a ham. He said the idea for the spiral ham slicer "came to him in a dream". Hoenselaar built his prototype spiral slicer using "a tire jack, a pie tin, a washing machine motor, and a knife".

In the 1930s, Hoenselaar sold honey-glazed hams to drugstores in Detroit. Hoenselaar taught lunch counter clerks the proper procedure of slicing ham for sandwiches with a knife; he later bought that drugstore in Detroit from the widow of the previous owner for five hundred dollars. With Hoenselaar's commitment to his slicer, and residing in Detroit, Hoenselaar founded The HoneyBaked Ham Company and Café in 1957.

When the company expanded nationally, he divided the country into four territories and assigned a territory to each of his four daughters.

The company is presently headed by Hoenselaar's granddaughter, Linda van Rees, who moved the headquarters to Alpharetta in 2015.

The Honey Baked Ham Company, LLC has grown to over 200 company owned retail stores and 200 franchise locations across the United States, as well as an ecommerce business. As of May 2017, the company is headquartered in Alpharetta, Georgia and privately owned by the Hoenselaar family.

Accolades
In October 2013, Consumer Reports called Honey Baked Ham "clearly best of the bunch". In 2019, Kim Severson with The New York Times called Harry J. Hoenselaar "the father of spiral-cut ham".

References 

American companies established in 1957
Food and drink companies established in 1957
Retail companies established in 1957
Franchises
Ham
Food and drink companies based in Georgia (U.S. state)
1957 establishments in Michigan